Jessica Garza Montes de Oca (born 22 September 1984) is a Mexican actress, singer-songwriter and writer.

Early life 
Garza Montes de Oca was born and raised in Mexico City. She has a BA in theatre from the Universidad de las Americas, Puebla.

Career

Acting
Garza Montes de Oca started in telenovelas for the network TV Azteca where she played supporting roles for productions including: Secretos del alma, Pobre rico, pobre, Lo que callamos las mujeres, Pobre diabla, Vuelveme a querer, Pasion Morena, Mujer comprada, and Cada Quien su Santo. Garza Montes de Oca starred in the musical I love you, you're Perfect now change and was Stage Manager for The Beauty and the Beast Mexico. Garza Montes de Oca moved to L.A to pursue her master's degree in film acting at The New York Film Academy, Universal Studios. She starred in several short films including Nighttime nominated in the Los Angeles Movie Awards and Oblivion, nominated in the Los Angeles Cinema Festival of Hollywood. She co-stars in the film Of Sentimental Value with Tommy "Tinny" Lister and Malik Yoba.

Music
Garza Montes de Oca released her first single, "Broken Memories", in 2013.

Awards and nominations

Garza Montes de Oca won the African Oscar 2013 for Best Soundtrack for the song America for the feature film The Fetus. She was also nominated in the African Oscars as "Favorite Actress" for her role in Of Sentimental Value

References

External links 

Actresses from Mexico City
Mexican film actresses
Mexican stage actresses
Mexican telenovela actresses
Mexican television actresses
1994 births
Living people
21st-century Mexican actresses
Singers from Mexico City
21st-century Mexican singers
21st-century Mexican women singers